Carl Brockelmann (17 September 1868 – 6 May 1956) German Semiticist, was the foremost orientalist of his generation. He was a professor at the universities in Breslau, Berlin and, from 1903, Königsberg. He is best known for his multi-volume Geschichte der arabischen Litteratur (first published 1898–1902) ('History of Arabic literature') which included all writers in Arabic to 1937, and remains the fundamental reference volume for all Arabic literature, apart from the Christian Arabic texts (covered by Georg Graf).

He also published Syrische Grammatik mit Litteratur, Chrestomathie und Glossar (1899), Semitische Sprachwissenschaft (1906), Lexicon syriacum (1928), and Arabische Grammatik (under his own name 1941, but this was the eleventh edition of the grammar of Albert Socin, previously revised by Brockelmann several times).

Career 
Brockelmann pursued Oriental studies, classical philology, and history in Rostock, Breslau, and Strasburg. He earned his Ph.D. in Strasburg, in 1890, under the direction of Theodor Nöldeke, and his Dr. habil. degree in Breslau in 1893. In 1900 he was appointed to a chair in Breslau, in 1903 in Königsberg, in 1910 in Halle, in 1922 in Berlin, and in 1923 in Breslau again. From 1932 to 1933 he served as the rector of the Breslau University. After his retirement in 1935 he returned to Halle/Saale, where he died.

Works
 
 
 Geschichte der arabischen Litteratur. First published as Geschichte der Arabischen Litteratur, 2 vols (Weimar: Felber, 1898-1902). Brockelmann then published three Supplementband ('supplement volumes'): Geschichte der arabischen Litteratur. Supplementband, 3 vols (Leiden: Brill, 1937-42). Thereafter, he published a second edition of the original two volumes:  Geschichte der Arabischen Litteratur, [2nd edn], 2 vols (Leiden: Brill, 1943-49). The complete set was then corrected and translated into English: Carl Brockelmann, History of the Arabic Written Tradition, trans. by Joep Lameer, Handbook of Oriental Studies. Section 1 The Near and Middle East, 117, 5 vols in 6 (Leiden: Brill, 2016-19), 
 
 
 Geschichte der christlichen Literaturen des Orients. 2nd Edition.  Leipzig 1909 
 Grundriss der vergleichenden Grammatik der semitischen Sprachen. Vols. 1–2, 1908/1913
 Semitische Sprachwissenschaft. 2nd Edition. 1916
 Geschichte der islamischen Völker und Staaten. R. Oldenbourg, München/ Berlin 1939
  History Of The Islamic Peoples, 1939
 Osttürkische Grammatik der islamischen Literatur-Sprachen Mittelasiens. Leiden 1954
 Hebräische Syntax. 1956
 Arabische Grammatik. Berlin and others 1904, . Numerous new editions, including Leipzig 1960 (revision of the grammar by Albert Socin).
   History of The Islamic Peoples     1960

Publications
 1895: Lexicon Syriacum. Berlin: Reuther & Reichard; Edinburgh: T. & T. Clark. [1995 edition: ]
 1908: Kurzgefasste vergleichende Grammatik der semitischen Sprachen. Berlin: Reuther and Reichard.
 1950: Abessinsche Studien. Berlin: Akademie Verlag.

References

External links
(Portrait gallery) Carl Brockelmann (1868-1956) at Leiden University
 Brockelmann, Carl: Deutschen Biographie (in German)
 Brockelmann, Karl: Martin-Luther-Universität-Halle-Wittenberg (in German)
 
 
 Works archive.org
 Works in SSG Vorderer Orient digital of the University and State Library of Saxony-Anhalt

1868 births
1956 deaths
People from Rostock
German orientalists
People from the Grand Duchy of Mecklenburg-Schwerin
German Arabists
Syriacists
Linguists from Germany
Academic staff of the Humboldt University of Berlin
Academic staff of the University of Königsberg
Academic staff of the University of Breslau
Members of the Prussian Academy of Sciences
German male non-fiction writers
Members of the German Academy of Sciences at Berlin
Historians of Arabic literature